Mihael Rajić (born 8 October 1984 in SR Croatia, SFR Yugoslavia) is a Croatian retired footballer.

He spent his entire playing career in Austrian football.

References

External links
 

1984 births
Living people
Association football fullbacks
Croatian footballers
FC Red Bull Salzburg players
SC Austria Lustenau players
SC Rheindorf Altach players
1. FC Vöcklabruck players
SV Ried players
FC Juniors OÖ players
Austrian Football Bundesliga players
2. Liga (Austria) players
Austrian Regionalliga players
Austrian Landesliga players
Croatian expatriate footballers
Expatriate footballers in Austria
Croatian expatriate sportspeople in Austria